Bobrovnikovo is a rural locality (a village) in Yudinskoye Rural Settlement, Velikoustyugsky District, Vologda Oblast, Russia. The population was 240 as of 2002. There are 10 streets.

Geography 
Bobrovnikovo is located 11 km northeast of Veliky Ustyug (the district's administrative centre) by road. Kupriyanovo is the nearest rural locality.

References 

Rural localities in Velikoustyugsky District